The president of the Examination Yuan is the head of the constitutional branch in the Republic of China.

List

Pre-1947 Constitution

Post-1947 Constitution

Timeline

See also
 Constitution of the Republic of China
 List of political office-holders of the Republic of China by age

References

External links
 Presidents - Examination Yuan

 
Examination Yuan